(+)-Sabinene 3-hydroxylase is an enzyme with systematic name (+)-sabinene,NADPH:oxygen oxidoreductase (3-hydroxylating). This enzyme catalyses the following chemical reaction

 (+)-sabinene + NADPH + H+ + O2  (+)-cis-sabinol + NADP+ + H2O

(+)-Sabinene 3-hydroxylase requires cytochrome P-450.

References

External links 
 

EC 1.14.13